Leathesia is a genus of brown algae belonging to the family Chordariaceae.

The genus has cosmopolitan distribution.

Species:

Leathesia berkeleyi 
Leathesia difformis 
Leathesia marina 
Leathesia mucosa 
Leathesia nana 
Leathesia umbellata

References

Chordariaceae
Brown algae genera